, is a shōjo manga series written by Hisaya Nakajo. The manga was serialized in Japan in Hakusensha's semi-monthly shōjo manga magazine, Hana to Yume. The series was concluded with the Japanese release of volume 23 in August 2004.

Hana-Kimi was published in English by Viz Media with the final volume released in the United States in April 2008.

The series centers on Mizuki Ashiya, a Japanese girl who lives in the United States. One day, she sees a track and field competition on TV, and becomes attracted to one of the high jump competitors, Izumi Sano. She begins to idolize the young athlete and eventually transfers to Japan to attend the same school that Sano attends. Sano attends an all-boys high school named Osaka Gakuen and Mizuki attempts to disguise herself as a boy to enter.

Plot
Mizuki Ashiya, a Japanese girl living in the United States, watches a program on TV featuring a high jumper named Izumi Sano. She was amazed by his performance and begins following his athletic career. Years later, she does research on him and discovers that he is currently attending Osaka High School. The school is unfortunately an all-boys school and Mizuki convinces her parents to send her to Japan by herself.

Oblivious to the fact that their daughter is going to attend a boys school, her parents let her go. To enter the school, she cuts off her long hair, disguises herself as a male, and tries her best to give hope to Sano after hearing that he no longer does the high jump anymore. As she settles in, an accident reveals her identity to Hokuto Umeda, the school doctor, and Izumi Sano. Izumi hides his knowledge of Mizuki's gender and tries to help her keep her secret, though it sure is not easy as many situations land Mizuki in compromising positions that will reveal her true gender.

Setting
 or Ohsaka Gakuen as written in the entrance gate of the school in the Japanese drama adaptation, is an all-boys school and the setting of the series. Its sister school is St. Blossoms, an all-girls high school.

The three grade levels are divided into three classes. These nine classes are divided into three dormitories, as most of the students do not stay around the school area. The culture within the individual dormitories are immensely different.

Most students residing in the first dormitory are athletes who were accepted into Osaka High on a sports scholarship. The head of dormitory is Tennouji. The head of the second dormitory is Minami Nanba. The students in the second dorm are a mix of athletes and scholars who have a sports or academic scholarship. The third dormitory consists mainly of artistic and intelligent people and is headed by Masao Himejima. Inter-dorm rivalries are common and become particularly intense during the school's cultural festival.

Characters

 
  (drama CD)
 Mizuki Ashiya is the female protagonist of the series. She admired Izumi Sano the moment she saw him high jump on TV. She disguises herself as a boy in order to enroll herself into Sano's school, Osaka Gakuen which allows her to get closer with Sano. She is a fun-loving, cheerful and optimistic character who cares deeply for her family and friends. Unfortunately, despite her kind heart, she is what one would call a ditz, so the secret of her gender has to constantly be protected by Sano. She has an older brother who arrived in Japan with the intent of bringing her home, but was forced to allow her to stay. It is suggested in the manga that the protectiveness of her older brother and her sheltered life in general has contributed to her frank and trusting nature, as well as her inability to hide her emotions.
 She was portrayed by Maki Horikita in the Japanese drama adaptation, Ella Chen in the Taiwanese drama adaptation and Sulli Choi in the Korean drama adaption.
 
  (drama CD)
 Izumi Sano is the male protagonist of the series. An excellent high jumper before entering high school, he stopped for personal reasons when he entered high school. He found out Mizuki's true gender due to an accident early in the series. When he was young, his parents were involved in a car accident which killed his mother, impacting the family deeply. Sano ran away from home because of disagreements with his father but father and son reconcile in the end.
 He was portrayed by Shun Oguri in the Japanese drama adaptation, Wu Zun in the Taiwanese drama adaptation and Choi Minho in the Korean drama adaption.
 
  (drama CD)
 Nakatsu is one of the students in living in the second dormitory. He likes Mizuki but he does not know that she is really a girl, causing some of his classmates to believe that he is homosexual. However, it is suggested that he is merely attracted to Mizuki's femininity which she has trouble hiding. When Nakatsu discovers Sano's feelings for Mizuki, he gives them his blessings in order to protect his friendship with Sano and let Mizuki be happy with the one she loves.
 He was portrayed by Toma Ikuta in the Japanese drama adaptation and Jiro Wang in the Taiwanese drama adaptation and Lee Hyun-woo in the Korea drama adaption.

Media

Manga

The manga series was first serialized in the 20th issue of Hakusensha's semi-monthly shōjo manga magazine, Hana to Yume in 1996. Its serialization continued where the series ended with 23 collected volumes with 144 chapters without including 5 special chapters that were published during the series' serialization and another 5 special chapters that were published after the series ended.

The series' 23 volumes were first published under the Hana to Yume Comics. It was then later re-published into 12 volumes of aizōban under the Hana to Yume Comics Special imprint. Each volume featured a new cover illustration and design as well as coloured pages.

Hana-Kimi was also published in English by Viz Media. The English release was previously only limited to Waldenbooks from February to May 2004. It was then made available to other retail stores after May that year. The English title originated from a fan abbreviation of the original Japanese title as the official U.S. translation ends the title with a he instead of e.

In March 2012, Viz Media released a 3-in-1 edition of all the previously published Hana-Kimi manga books in North America. Instead of 23 manga books, the series spans a total of eight 3-in-1 large manga books. The last volume of the 3-in-1 special edition was published in April, 2014.

Books
The illustration collection was also licensed in English by Viz Media under the title, The Art of Hana-Kimi. It was released on November 21, 2006.

On August 20, 2009, a manga anthology was published as a tribute to the series was released under the Hana to Yume Comics Special imprint. It was titled,  and was drawn by various manga artist including Satoshi Morie, affiliated with the magazine where Hana-Kimi was serialized. The cover was illustrated by the original author herself.

Drama CDs
There were a number of drama CDs released for the series. Only 2 were released commercially by Hakusensha and Marine Entertainment. The first drama CD was released on April 26, 2000. The second drama CD, titled  was released on August 23, 2002.

Live-action drama
Hana-Kimi has been adapted into several live-television dramas:
 2006 – Hanazakarino Kimitachihe. It starred Ella Chen of S.H.E, Wu Chun and Jiro Wang of Fahrenheit and Danson Tang. The adaption was aired on Chinese Television System (CTS) and Gala Television (GTV) Variety Show/CH 28 from November 2006 for 15 episodes.
 2007 – Hanazakari no Kimitachi e. It starred Maki Horikita, Shun Oguri and Toma Ikuta. The adaption was aired on Fuji Television from July to September 2007 for 12 episodes.
 2011 – Hanazakari no Kimitachi e 2011. It starred Atsuko Maeda of Japan's popular girl group AKB48, Aoi Nakamura and Shohei Miura. The adaption was aired on Fuji Television from July to September 2011 for 11 episodes.
 2012 – To the Beautiful You, starring Sulli of f(x), Choi Minho of SHINee and Lee Hyun-woo. The adaption aired on SBS on August 15, 2012 for 16 episodes.

Reception
The 23 Japanese volumes of the series has sold over 17 million copies in Japan. The English release of volume 6 was ranked 9th in the Bookscan chart while six months after, volume 9 came in 5th as one of the top-selling graphic novels in North America. The English release of volume 1 and 2 of the series were nominated under the Graphic Novel category of The Quills Awards in 2005. The series came in 3rd place for Top Shōjo Manga in Singapore in February 2007. According to Tohan, aizōban volumes 11 and 12 ranked 6th place for the week of September 12, 2007.

The English release of volume 17 was ranked 8th in the Publishers Weekly Comics Bestseller list. The 23rd volume of Hana-Kimi was released by Viz Media on April 1, 2008 and it was ranked 5th in the monthly Top 20 Graphic Novels rankings for the March 31, 2008 to April 27, 2008 period.

The total sales for the series' Japanese volumes came in 5th after Death Note in the ranking of the most read series throughout year 2007. The series ranked 37th place in Matt Blind's Top 300 series in 2008. It was later chosen as one of the series for School Library Journal's Good Comics for Kids Summer Reading Challenge in 2009.

Maria Lin noted that while she normally disliked female protagonists in manga, she praised Mizuki as an exception, crediting her with lifting the manga above other "pretty boy manga", enjoying her "never-give-up attitude". While Lin enjoyed the art style, she found the male characters' designs at times generic. Sheena McNeil felt that the premise was "shallow", but upon reading, found herself "caught up in the story". McNeil praised the art, citing its importance in a story of deception, enjoying the "gorgeous" character designs, but appreciating the departure from strict aesthetics for humour.

Liann Cooper felt that Hana-Kimi was one of Viz's most important shōjo properties due to its combination of humour, angst and the artwork, but criticised their cover design.

Kat Avila, due to the fourth volume's humour and attractive male characters, found she enjoyed Hana-Kimi better than Girl Got Game.

By the fourth and fifth volume, the author had increased the cast, but Maria Lin felt that the storyline was still coherent despite this.

References

Further reading

External links
 

1996 manga
Cross-dressing in anime and manga
Hakusensha franchises
Hakusensha manga
Manga adapted into television series
Romance anime and manga
Shōjo manga
Viz Media manga